Enzo Collotti (15 August 1929 – 7 October 2021) was an Italian historian and academic. He taught contemporary history at the University of Florence, the University of Bologna, and the University of Trieste. He is considered an important historian of the Italian resistance and in the study of Nazism. He was married to his colleague Enrica Pischel.

References

1929 births
2021 deaths
20th-century Italian historians
Academic staff of the University of Florence
Academic staff of the University of Bologna
Academic staff of the University of Trieste
People from Messina